Gabrielle is a 2013 Canadian drama film directed by Louise Archambault and starring Gabrielle Marion-Rivard as Gabrielle, a young woman with Williams syndrome who participates in a choir of developmentally disabled adults, and begins a romantic relationship with her choirmate Martin (Alexandre Landry). It features a cast from a real choir for people with disabilities, with Marion-Rivard being an actress who actually has Williams syndrome.

The film premiered at the Locarno International Film Festival on 12 August 2013. It garnered six Canadian Screen Awards nominations and won two, including Best Motion Picture.

Plot
In Montreal, Gabrielle is a 22-year-old woman with Williams syndrome and diabetes, handling her own insulin injections but not living independently. She is a member of The Muses of Montreal, a musical choir for people with disabilities, at the Recreational Centre, and meets a fellow singer named Martin, with whom she develops a relationship. Her sister, Sophie, is attempting to arrange travel to meet with her boyfriend in India, but is unwilling to leave Gabrielle behind. One night, Gabrielle and Martin are caught engaging in sexual conduct publicly in the Centre. Sophie and Martin's mother are called to the Centre to address the matter. Sophie defends Gabrielle and Martin's right to have sex in private, as they are in love and she feels they should be able to, as adults. Sophie also asserts Gabrielle has been educated in safe sex. Martin's mother is angry at the notion, saying Martin is a virgin and that sex is different for people with disabilities. Gabrielle and Martin no longer see each other at the Centre.

Gabrielle expresses frustration with her lack of autonomy to Sophie. Sophie wishes to see proof Gabrielle can live autonomously, warning her that having her own apartment will not bring Martin back. Gabrielle spends a day alone in the apartment, setting off the fire alarm with burnt toast, but when Sophie returns she is more concerned to see how Gabrielle has handled her diabetes. At the Centre, Gabrielle mourns Martin's absence while The Muses prepare for a concert with Robert Charlebois. Sophie is finally persuaded to travel to India, though this means she will miss the concert. On the day of the concert, Martin and Gabrielle have sex before performing.

Cast

Production
Director Louise Archambault said the story was inspired by an intellectually disabled neighbour who shared a swimming pool with her, and required help in the change room. Archambault said her neighbour had a "strong personality." The filmmakers drew the cast of the film from a real life choir for people with disabilities in Montreal, including star Gabrielle Marion-Rivard, who has Williams syndrome and sang in Les Muses. Archambault said, "They have personalities— a lot of personality— and I did learn a lot." The choir lead's performance of "Ordinaire" by Robert Charlebois, and the parallel between the lyrics and Archambault's screenplay, moved her to appeal to Charlebois to be in the film. The filmmakers had to train some of the actors with disabilities to not look at the camera during their performances.

The filmmakers also sought a man with disabilities to play Martin, but did not feel they could find someone to portray a believable romance with Marion-Rivard, and cast experienced actor Alexandre Landry. Marion-Rivard was anxious about the sex scenes, but credited Landry with making her comfortable.

The film addresses the controversial issue of sexuality and disability. Archambault consulted with producers and financiers on how to portray this in an acceptable way.

Release
The film was first shown at the Locarno International Film Festival on 12 August 2013, where Archambault and Marion-Rivard said it received great applause. It was screened in the Special Presentation section at the 2013 Toronto International Film Festival.

The film opened in Toronto and Ottawa on 10 January 2014. This was followed by screenings in Edmonton on 17 January and Vancouver and Winnipeg on 24 January. Entertainment One sold distribution to Haut et Court for France and to Agora Film for Switzerland. Entertainment One also planned in October 2013 to release it in the United States.

Reception

Critical reception
In Canada, The Globe and Mail'''s Liam Lacey gave the film three stars, calling it "a big-hearted drama" though lacking subtlety.  praised the film in La Presse as real and vibrant. Peter Howell of The Toronto Star gave the film three stars, writing "Gabrielle reminds us, through love and music, that perception is not reality and that prejudice is an attitude, not a truth."

Stephen Holden gave the film a positive review in The New York Times, saying Marion-Rivard saved the film from becoming condescending. Jay Weissberg, writing for Variety, called the film "uplifting," and said it was particularly great for its handling of sex and people with disabilities. Betsy Sharkey of The Los Angeles Times wrote Marion-Rivard gave the film credibility and it was difficult to deny the enjoyment of the experience.  The film has a 95% approval rating on Rotten Tomatoes, based on 22 reviews.

Accolades
The film was selected as the Canadian entry for the Best Foreign Language Film at the 86th Academy Awards, but it was not nominated. It was also a finalist for Best Canadian Film at the Toronto Film Critics Association Awards 2013, alongside The Dirties and the eventual winner, Watermark''.

See also
 List of submissions to the 86th Academy Awards for Best Foreign Language Film
 List of Canadian submissions for the Academy Award for Best Foreign Language Film

References

External links
 

2013 films
2013 drama films
2010s French-language films
Best Picture Genie and Canadian Screen Award winners
Canadian drama films
Films directed by Louise Archambault
Films about disability
French-language Canadian films
2010s Canadian films